Gary MacGregor (born September 21, 1954 – April 20, 1995) was a Canadian ice hockey forward.

Early life 
MacGregor was born in Kingston, Ontario. During his final season of junior hockey with the Cornwall Royals in 1973–74, MacGregor scored 100 goals.

Career 
MacGregor was drafted by both the National Hockey League and World Hockey Association in 1974, and chose the WHA. He had a superb rookie season in 1974–75 with the Chicago Cougars, averaging nearly one point per game. But his productivity dropped sharply for the remainder of his pro career. Over his career, he played professionally in the WHA with the Chicago Cougars, Denver Spurs, Ottawa Civics, Cleveland Crusaders, New England Whalers, Indianapolis Racers, and Edmonton Oilers. MacGregor also played in Europe.

Personal life 
MacGregor died at his home in Kingston, Ontario, of a heart attack at the age of 40. He was inducted posthumously into the Kingston and District Sports Hall of Fame.

Career statistics

References

External links

1954 births
1995 deaths
Adler Mannheim players
Canadian ice hockey centres
Canadian people of Scottish descent
Chicago Cougars draft picks
Chicago Cougars players
Cleveland Crusaders players
Cornwall Royals (QMJHL) players
Denver Spurs (WHA) players
Edmonton Oilers (WHA) players
Eishockey-Bundesliga players
Ice hockey people from Ontario
Sportspeople from Kingston, Ontario
Indianapolis Racers players
Montreal Canadiens draft picks
New England Whalers players
Nova Scotia Voyageurs players
Ottawa Civics players
Springfield Indians players
World Hockey Association first round draft picks
Canadian expatriate ice hockey players in Germany